Owen Lentz (born 24 January 1980) is a former South African-born American rugby union player. He played for Maryland Exiles and gained 8 caps since his debut in 2006 for the American national side. Lentz played as a hooker or occasionally as flanker.

Lentz represented South Africa at under-21 level before switching allegiance to the US.

References

 Info at usarugby.com
 Stats at scrum.com

American rugby union players
1980 births
Rugby union hookers
Living people
United States international rugby union players
Sportspeople from Qonce
Alumni of Queen's College Boys' High School